Stefan Edberg was the defending champion but did not compete that year.

Jakob Hlasek won in the final 6–1, 7–5 against Anders Järryd.

Seeds
A champion seed is indicated in bold text while text in italics indicates the round in which that seed was eliminated.

  Miloslav Mečíř (first round)
  Jakob Hlasek (champion)
  Yannick Noah (semifinals)
  Jonas Svensson (first round)
  John Fitzgerald (first round)
  Darren Cahill (semifinals) 
  Anders Järryd (final)
  Magnus Gustafsson (second round)

Draw

External links
 1989 ABN World Tennis Tournament draw

1989 Grand Prix (tennis)
1989 ABN World Tennis Tournament